Women's Physique World was a magazine covering female bodybuilding and fitness and figure competition, published from 1984 to 2006.

History and profile
The first issue was dated Fall 1984, and featured Lori Walkup on the cover.  Subsequently, the magazine was published with varying frequency, ranging from two to six issues annually.

Women's Physique World also produced documentary style videos that featured the women posing in non-contest settings in bikinis, dresses, and other outfits. Most of the videos feature bodybuilders or fitness and figure competitors, but athletes from sports such as arm wrestling and track & field were occasionally featured. The videos often included footage of the subjects performing gym workouts, as well as interview segments.  Women's Physique World also produced a number of contest videos. These typically featured NPC level shows, though the magazine also produced the video for the 1999 Ms. Olympia contest.

Human sexuality scholar Cindy Patton observed that the female bodybuilders in Women's Physique World are shown as "fresh-faced girls who seem to have accidentally produced their specialized shape".

References

External links
Official website

1984 establishments in New Jersey
2006 disestablishments in New Jersey
Defunct women's magazines published in the United States
Female bodybuilding magazines
Fitness magazines
Magazines established in 1984
Magazines disestablished in 2006
Magazines published in New Jersey
Sports magazines published in the United States